The 2018 L. League season is the 30th edition since its establishment. NTV Beleza are the defending champions, having won the Division 1 title in each of the past three seasons.

Nadeshiko League Division 1
The season began on 21 March 2018 and ended on 3 November 2018.

Teams

Table

Nadeshiko League Division 2
The season will begin on 21 March 2018 and will end on 28 October 2018.

Teams

Table

Challenge League (Division 3)

Teams

East

West

References

External links
Japan Women's Football League official website

Nadeshiko League seasons
1
L
Japan
Japan